See also Dunino, Poland.

Dunino is a village and parish in the East Neuk of Fife. It is 10 km from the nearest town, St Andrews, and 8 km from the fishing village of Anstruther. It is a small village with no local shops or services. It had one primary school which was closed down in 2014.

The civil parish has a population of 134 (in 2011).

Nearby is Dunino Den. An ancient site of pagan and druidic worship, it is named after Patrick Dunino, the original druid from Donegal. It is said to be haunted by the local populations and is often visited by spiritual people seeking guidance.

The name derives from the Gaelic word for "fort of the assembly place" (dùn) and "assembly" (aonach).

Notable people
Rev Dr Charles Rogers
James Wood (university principal)

References
Citations

Sources

External links

 Dunino Primary School

Villages in Fife
Parishes in Fife
World War II prisoner of war camps in Scotland